Andri Sigþórsson (born 25 March 1977) is an Icelandic former international footballer.

Career
Andri, who played as a striker, played as a youth for KR, before joining the youth setup of Bayern Munich. He played for Bayern's reserve team in the Regionalliga, but returned to Iceland in 1996, rejoining KR. In 2000, he was joint top scorer in the Icelandic Premier Division, and briefly returned to Germany in 1997, for a loan spell with FSV Zwickau. After three more years with KR, moved to Austria, joining SV Salzburg, then to Norway, where he played for Molde FK. His career was cut short in 2004 when he suffered a serious knee injury. He made seven appearances for Iceland, scoring two goals. These goals came in back-to-back matches against Poland and the Czech Republic.

Personal life
Andri is famous for being a star player in Championship Manager 3, being set with the maximum potential of 200. His brother Kolbeinn is also a professional footballer and Andri has acted as his agent. After retiring from football he has also helped run his father's string of bakeries in Molde. Andri's daughter Amanda Andradóttir made her debut for the Iceland women's national football team in September 2021.

References

1977 births
Living people
Andri Sigthorsson
Andri Sigthorsson
Andri Sigthorsson
Andri Sigthorsson
Andri Sigthorsson
Association football forwards
Andri Sigthorsson
2. Bundesliga players
Austrian Football Bundesliga players
Eliteserien players
FC Bayern Munich II players
Andri Sigthorsson
FSV Zwickau players
FC Red Bull Salzburg players
Molde FK players
Expatriate footballers in Germany
Expatriate footballers in Austria
Expatriate footballers in Norway